Everglow (stylized in all caps) is a South Korean girl group formed by Yuehua Entertainment. The group is composed of six members: E:U, Sihyeon, Mia, Onda, Aisha, and Yiren. Everglow debuted on March 18, 2019, with the single album Arrival of Everglow.

Career

2008–2018: Pre-debut activities
In 2008, Aisha auditioned for JYP Entertainment and passed. She was a prospective member of the agency's future girl group (which would become Twice), but she ended up leaving JYP Entertainment after being a trainee for over eight years.

Sihyeon competed in the first season of Mnet's reality television competition Produce 101 in 2016. She finished in 40th place, and subsequently signed with Yuehua Entertainment.

Onda competed on Mnet's reality television competition Idol School in 2017 under her real name, Jo Se-rim. She was eliminated in the fourth episode, finishing in 40th place. E:U, who used to be a stunt cheerleader in 2015, was revealed as Yuehua Entertainment's first trainee in March 2017 through the vlog series Jiwon's Vlog on the agency's official Twitter account. Later that same year, she hosted the television show Delicious Cooking Class, broadcast on SBS.

In 2018, Sihyeon and Yiren competed in Produce 48 but were eliminated in the eleventh episode, finishing in 27th and 28th place, respectively. E:U started modeling for the Korean fashion brand Stare Shoes under her real name, Park Ji-won. Yiren graduated in Traditional Dance at the Zhejiang Vocational Academy of Art in her hometown of Hangzhou, China.

2019: Debut with Arrival of Everglow and Hush
On February 17, 2019, Yuehua Entertainment revealed that they would debut a new girl group named Everglow. The group's official Instagram and fan cafe opened on February 18. The company revealed the members of the group through the "Crank in Film" series on Stone Music Entertainment's YouTube channel. On February 28, Everglow posted a dance cover video of the song "Rumor", which Sihyeon previously has performed on Produce 48, on their official YouTube channel, and it surpassed two million views in less than 24 hours. The group's concept photos were released on March 8. On March 13, the music video teaser for Everglow's debut single "Bon Bon Chocolat" was released on Stone Music Entertainment's YouTube channel and surpassed five million views two days later. Before debuting, Everglow was already called a "monster rookie" by the media.

On March 18, Everglow released their first single album, Arrival of Everglow, with the lead single "Bon Bon Chocolat". The song was co-written by American singer and songwriter Melanie Fontana, who previously wrote for groups such as boy band BTS and singer Tiffany Young. Member E:U co-wrote the track "Moon". The group had their debut stage on March 21 on Mnet's music program M Countdown. Everglow enjoyed commercial success with their releases: Arrival of Everglow debuted and peaked at number six on the Gaon Album Chart, selling more than 23,000 copies as of September 2019, while "Bon Bon Chocolat" debuted and peaked at number five on the Billboard World Digital Song Sales chart, selling 5,000 copies in the US as of August 2019. On August 13, the first episode of the group's first television reality show Everglow Land premiered on Mnet. Its fifth and last episode premiered on September 10.

On August 19, the group released their second single album Hush with lead single "Adios". All three songs from the single album entered the Billboard World Digital Song Sales chart: "Adios" debuted and peaked at number two and kept charting for six weeks; the B-side tracks "Hush" and "You Don't Know Me" debuted and peaked at number eight and 10, respectively. In addition, "Adios" ranked first on the iTunes K-pop Chart in 11 different countries and on the YouTube Trending Worldwide chart. Billboard columnist Jeff Benjamin described Everglow as a "group with a strong and empowering image that tends to connect more with Western audiences". Due to their commercial success, on September 24, Everglow won their first music show award on The Show. The music video for "Adios" surpassed 100 million views in August 2019.

2020: Reminiscence and -77.82X-78.29
On February 3, the group released their first extended play (EP) Reminiscence with lead single "Dun Dun". The song marked Everglow's first appearance on one of Gaon's single charts, reaching number 63 on the Download Chart, while the EP debuted at number four on the Album Chart and sold over 27,000 copies in the first month of release. The group's release was very well received by the South Korean media, which described Everglow as the "ultimate performance boss". The music video for "Dun Dun" gathered 20 million views in less than a day and a half, and surpassed the 200 million views in April 2021. 

On January 21, it was announced that Everglow would embark on the Everlasting Tour in USA, beginning in Dallas, Texas on March 6. Everglow were scheduled to perform in five different cities in the United States, these being Dallas, Atlanta, Chicago, Jersey City and Los Angeles. However, due to concerns of the coronavirus outbreak, their sold-out Los Angeles show was cancelled.

The group's second extended play, -77.82X–78.29, was released on September 21, alongside the synth-pop lead single "La Di Da" and three other songs, "Untouchable", "Gxxd Boy" and "No Good Reason". Member E:U took part in writing the lyrics for "La Di Da", making it the second Everglow song to be co-written by her. The group's concept photos were released along with their schedule for promotions. At the end of 2020, "La Di Da" was named the best K-pop song of the year by Billboard.

Everglow released a soundtrack for the Korean TV series The Spies Who Loved Me on November 12, titled "Let Me Dance", which is a remake of the 2003 song of the same name by Lexy featuring Teddy Park.

2021: Last Melody and Return of the Girl 
On May 25, 2021, the group released their third single album, Last Melody, with lead single "First". Their comeback concept was described as "warriors from the future". On June 5, "First" entered the Billboards World Digital Song Sales chart at number five along with their two additional singles, "Don't Ask Don't Tell" and "Please, Please", which peaked at numbers 20 and 21, respectively. On June 1, 2021, the group won their second music program trophy on The Show with "First".

In August 2021, Everglow partnered with UNICEF on the "Promise" campaign, intended to promote world peace and to help children around the world be happier. On August 25, 2021, the group released the music video for the single "Promise". The next day, the group started a "Promise" dance challenge which consists of recording a video dancing to the song's choreography. For every person who took part in the challenge, UNICEF donated a "Superhero Pack", containing polio and measles vaccines, and anti-malaria insecticide-treated mosquito nets, to children around the world.

On December 1, 2021, the group released their third extended play, Return of the Girl, along with the lead single "Pirate" and four other tracks, "Back Together", "Don't Speak", "Nighty Night" and "Company". All the songs on the EP entered various domestic charts. The music video for "Pirate" gained a million views five hours after the release. On December 17, a performance video for the B-side track "Don't Speak" was released in Everglow's official YouTube channel.

2022–present: First international collaborations and record-setting concerts 
The girl group released a remix version of their 2021 single "Pirate" on April 15, 2022 in collaboration with Dutch-Moroccan DJ and producer R3hab,  who has also made remixes for other K-pop groups and world-famous singers. 

On July 1, 2022, Everglow performed at the Saranghae KSA K-pop Festival 2022 in Jeddah, becoming the first girl group in history to perform in Saudi Arabia. In August and November, they held a solo concert in Almaty and set another record for the first solo concert by a K-pop group in Kazakhstan. In November, the group continued to perform in Central Asia with two headlining concerts in Kyrgyzstan and Kazakhstan.

Everglow partnered with German DJ and producer TheFatRat to release the English language single "Ghost Light" on November 18, along with a Korean version. The following week, the girl group performed at Ripples for Hope, a fundraising K-pop event held in Manila, the Philippines by The Ripple Society, a Filipino youth-oriented non-profit organization. The group was scheduled to tour Southeast Asia with four concerts in December, but it was cancelled for unspecified reasons. By the end of 2022, Korean media praised Everglow for having performed in nine different countries in half a year without a world tour: Saudi Arabia, South Korea, England, Australia, Japan, Kazakhstan, Kyrgyzstan, the Netherlands, and the Philippines.

Members
Adapted from their Naver profile:
 E:U – rapper, dancer
 Sihyeon – leader, vocalist
 Mia – vocalist, dancer
 Onda – vocalist, dancer
 Aisha – vocalist, rapper
 Yiren – vocalist, rapper, dancer

Timeline
On the debut days, member E:U was introduced as the leader of Everglow. However, the leadership role was transferred to Sihyeon, as announced during the group's showcase for Last Melody on May 25, 2021.

On January 9, 2022, Yuehua Entertainment announced that Yiren would take a break from Everglow's activities in order to spend time with her family in China and for academic reasons. She resumed group activities in December, 2022.

On August 11, 2022, Aisha took a brief break from activities due to sudden health issues. She resumed her activities at the Super Music Festival 2022 in Tokyo on August 22, 2022.

Discography

Extended plays

Single albums

Singles

Other charted songs

Other appearances

Filmography

Television series

Television shows

Videography

Music videos

Concerts

Headlining tours
 Everglow: Everlasting Tour in USA (2020; Los Angeles concert was cancelled due to the COVID-19 pandemic)
 Everglow Southeast Asia Tour (2022; cancelled)

Headlining concerts 

 Everglow Concert in Almaty (2022)
 Everglow Concert in Bishkek (2022)
 Everglow Concert in Astana (2022)

Online concerts 
 Everglow 1st Online Concert "THE FIRST" (2021)

Awards and nominations

Notes

References

External links

 Official website

Yuehua Entertainment artists
2019 establishments in South Korea
K-pop music groups
Musical groups established in 2019
South Korean dance music groups
South Korean girl groups